The Europe Zone was one of the three regional zones of the 1975 Davis Cup.

32 teams entered the Europe Zone, competing across 2 sub-zones. 4 teams in each sub-zone entered the competition in the pre-qualifying rounds, competing head-to-head for 2 spots in the preliminary rounds. The 4 winners in the pre-qualifying rounds joined an additional 20 teams in the preliminary rounds, with 12 teams in each sub-zone competing for 4 places in the main draw, to join the 4 finalists from the 1974 Europe Zone.

The winners of each sub-zone's main draw went on to compete in the Inter-Zonal Zone against the winners of the Americas Zone and Eastern Zone.

Sweden defeated Spain in the Zone A final, and Czechoslovakia defeated France in the Zone B final, resulting in both Sweden and France progressing to the Inter-Zonal Zone.

Zone A

Pre-qualifying round

Draw

Results
Iran vs. Lebanon

Israel vs. Luxembourg

Preliminary rounds

Draw

First round
Denmark vs. Greece

Great Britain vs. Iran

Poland vs. Portugal

Israel vs. Switzerland

Qualifying round
Spain vs. Denmark

Austria vs. Great Britain

Poland vs. Sweden

West Germany vs. Switzerland

Main Draw

Draw

Quarterfinals
Spain vs. Great Britain

West Germany vs. Sweden

Semifinals
Spain vs. Romania 

Soviet Union vs. Sweden

Final
Spain vs. Sweden

Zone B

Pre-qualifying round

Draw

Results
Nigeria vs. Kenya

Turkey vs. Ireland

Preliminary rounds

Draw

First round
Finland vs. Hungary

Monaco vs. Nigeria

Belgium vs. Norway

Bulgaria vs. Turkey

Qualifying round
Hungary vs. Netherlands

Monaco vs. Egypt

France vs. Belgium

Yugoslavia vs. Bulgaria

Main Draw

Draw

Quarterfinals
Egypt vs. Hungary

France vs. Yugoslavia

Semifinals
Czechoslovakia vs. Hungary

France vs. Italy

Final
Czechoslovakia vs. France

References

Davis Cup Europe/Africa Zone
Europe Zone
Davis Cup
Davis Cup
Davis Cup
Davis Cup
Davis Cup
Davis Cup
Davis Cup
1975 in German tennis